Miloš Budaković (Serbian Cyrillic: Милош Будаковић; born July 10, 1991 in Šabac) is a Serbian football goalkeeper, who plays for AB in the Faroe Islands Premier League.

Early career
Miloš Budaković began his career in his native Serbia playing for FK Mačva Šabac. In 2010, he moved to KS Cracovia and he became the second goalkeeper. In the 2011/12 season he was on loan to Olimpia Elbląg and played in I liga (Poland). In 2013, he moved to FK Novi Pazar and played for the first time in the Serbian SuperLiga. His debut in the Serbian SuperLiga was against FK Smederevo.

External links
 Profile at Srbijafudbal.

References

Living people
1991 births
Sportspeople from Šabac
Serbian footballers
Serbian expatriate footballers
Association football goalkeepers
Serbian SuperLiga players
I liga players
Faroe Islands Premier League players
FK Novi Pazar players
FK Mladost Velika Obarska players
FK Rad players
MKS Cracovia (football) players
Olimpia Elbląg players
FK Mačva Šabac players
Expatriate footballers in Poland
Expatriate footballers in Bosnia and Herzegovina
Expatriate footballers in the Faroe Islands
Serbian expatriate sportspeople in Poland
Serbian expatriate sportspeople in Bosnia and Herzegovina
Serbian expatriate sportspeople in the Faroe Islands